Martin Kinnear Haese (born 22 October 1965) was the Lord Mayor of Adelaide in South Australia from 2014–2018. Haese is an educator and an entrepreneur, who founded the Youthworks fashion chain in 1993 and built the business into a national chain of clothing, footwear and lifestyle stores which he sold in 2005.

Haese co-founded the Entrepreneurs' Organization in South Australia and later became the General Manager of the Rundle Mall Management Authority, a subsidiary organisation of the City of Adelaide, from 2010 to 2013. As General Manager, Haese successfully launched public holiday trading and built the case for a AUD$30 million public realm upgrade.

From 2010 to 2014, Haese was the Chairman of the Bay to Birdwood motoring event. He has served on various boards including the Adelaide Convention Bureau, South Australian Youth Arts Board and holds a Master of Business Administration (MBA) from the Australian Institute of Business. He was a guest lecturer for the University of Wollongong and the Australian Institute of Business for several years. Haese was also the national Chair of the Council of Capital City Lord Mayors in 2015.

Haese was elected Lord Mayor of Adelaide in November 2014, defeating incumbent Stephen Yarwood by 218 votes. As Lord Mayor, he led a partnership with TPG Telecom to roll out a 10 Gigabit ultra-fast fibre optic data network across the City of Adelaide and a number of investment partnerships with the State Government of South Australia into improved laneways, tramways and bikeways projects. 

Haese was a speaker at the Paris COP21 in December 2015. Haese promoted Adelaide as a UNESCO City of Music.

In September 2018, Haese announced that he would not contest the 2018 election.

In 2019, Haese was appointed CEO of Business SA.

Personal life
Haese is married to Genevieve Theseira-Haese, a Singaporean born marketing and communications entrepreneur.

References

External links

 Personal Website

1965 births
Living people
Mayors and Lord Mayors of Adelaide
South Australian local councillors
Australian Institute of Business alumni